Shantae is a series of platform games developed by WayForward. The eponymous heroine of the series, a half-genie, was created by Erin Bozon, while the games were created from this character by her husband Matt Bozon. The series consists of five games: Shantae (2002), Shantae: Risky's Revenge (2010), Shantae and the Pirate's Curse (2014), Shantae: Half-Genie Hero (2016) and Shantae and the Seven Sirens (2019).

Set in the fictional world of Sequin Land, the series follows Shantae, a half-genie who serves as the guardian of her hometown, Scuttle Town, and more generally Sequin Land as a whole, protecting it from various threats, which generally involve to some extent her nemesis, the pirate Risky Boots. The setting displays oriental-inspired aesthetics with fantasy, dark fantasy and steampunk elements. All games involve collecting new powers and items, which vary from game to game, to strengthen Shantae and unlock access to new areas.

Although released to strong reviews, the first game was a financial disappointment. Its poor sales are generally attributed to its late release on the Game Boy Color, which at the time had been succeeded by the Game Boy Advance. The series resurfaced in 2010 with Risky's Revenge, and has since enjoyed more commercial success and a growth in popularity. The series has been met with strong critical reception, and is considered the flagship series of WayForward. By 2020, the series had sold more than three million copies.

History
The character of Shantae was created by Erin Bell, the wife of Matt Bozon, the game's creator. In 1994, during their engagement, Erin got a flash of inspiration while coming back from her camp counsellor days, and created the character, naming her "Shantae" after one of the campers, as well as developing her dancing abilities. Matt later asked her what she would come up with if she was to create a video game character, and she introduced him to Shantae. Matt liked the idea and fleshed out the mythology and cast of the game. Erin imagined that the character could summon or charm animals by belly-dancing. This would later become the basis for the transformation dances. Matt has provided two contradictory stories about how the idea for the hair whip came to be: in one, he said he was inspired by the nine-foot-long hair of his wife, while in the other he claims that Erin's original sketches already featured Shantae using her hair as a weapon.

Matt Bozon has stated that his main influences for the game series are Castlevania, Aladdin, Mega Man, The Legend of Zelda and anime, mostly Ranma ½ which he claims as a heavy influence, and others like Nadia: The Secret of Blue Water, Hayao Miyazaki's films, and Pokémon, as well as 80s cartoons like DuckTales or The Transformers, while Erin Bozon's main influence was I Dream of Jeannie. The signature catchphrase from the franchise, "Ret-2-Go", was created by a friend of theirs who kept using it when they were working on animation clean up for the Warner Bros. animated film The Iron Giant, and the expression made its way into the script as an inside joke. Matt also elaborated a bit on the development of Sky's character, who was initially named "Twitch" and had a different appearance. She was altered later on in development, and the original Twitch character served as the basis for a similarly-named character and her friend in Shantae and the Pirate's Curse.

When asked about whether the Shantae series was conceived as pushing feminist values because of its strong female cast, Matt Bozon acknowledged that he liked to portray the Shantae world as having the girls "run the show" and not be defined solely by their appearances. While he admitted that most female characters had a deliberately sexy design to them, and the male characters often displayed a variety of weaknesses, he also said that he just liked depicting Shantae's world this way "for no precise reason", and that it was certainly possible that strong male characters could appear later in the franchise's future.

Characters

Shantae

Shantae is a half-genie, the daughter of a human father and genie mother. She is described as having few magical abilities, including being capable to whip her hair as a weapon, but has a strong sense of right and wrong and is a skilled dancer.

Mimic

Mimic is a member of the Relic Hunters, a society of treasure hunters who unearth and study ancient artifacts. Although not related to her by blood, he is Shantae's adoptive uncle, as he raised her after her parents' disappearance.

Sky

Sky is Shantae's friend, a war bird trainer and the daughter of a Relic Hunter herself. Never seen without her pet war bird Wrench, she is described as being in a hurry to grow up. Sky appears as a playable character in Half-Genie Heros "Friends to the End" mode.

Bolo

Bolo is Shantae's friend and sparring partner. He is described as being rather slow and very easily attracted to girls, though he seeks to prove himself as capable of being a hero. Bolo appears as a playable character in Half-Genie Heros "Friends to the End" mode.

Rottytops

Rottytops is a sentient zombie girl who is described as being mischievous and constantly looking for trouble for fun. After her first encounter with Shantae in the first game, although her behavior toward her remains ambiguous, in-game dialogue in Shantae and the Pirate's Curse reveals that she holds Shantae in great esteem and wants to be her friend. She has two brothers named Abner Cadaver and Poe. Rottytops appears as a playable character in Half-Genie Heros "Friends to the End" mode.

Risky Boots

Risky Boots the lady-pirate is Shantae's evil nemesis and the series' primary antagonist. She constantly seeks to conquer Sequin Land or take revenge on Shantae for ruining her schemes. Risky is aided by her pirate crew, made up of tiny humanoid creatures called Tinkerbats. Shantae and the Pirate's Curse reveals that she was once second-in-command to a very dangerous being named the Pirate Master, and was corrupted by dark magic while serving him. Risky aids Shantae against the Pirate Master in Pirate's Curse and appears as a playable character in Half-Genie Heros "Pirate Queen's Quest" mode.

Games

Shantae (2002)

The first game in the series, Shantae, was released for the Game Boy Color in 2002, and was met with generally positive responses. However, according to director Matt Bozon, the game sold poorly, due in part to releasing after the Game Boy Advance. However, the game has since gained significant recognition, with some reviewers considering it one of the best games released for the Game Boy Color.

The game was re-released for the Nintendo 3DS Virtual Console on July 18, 2013, with a Nintendo Switch re-release releasing later on April 22, 2021, with a special Game Boy Advance-enhanced mode, featuring a bonus Tinkerbat transformation and save states, multiple display options, control improvements, and a mini art gallery.

Shantae: Risky's Revenge (2010)

The second game in the series, Shantae: Risky's Revenge, was released for the Nintendo DSi via the system's DSiWare service in 2010, and was later ported to iOS in 2011. The game received positive reviews, being awarded the Best Visuals and Best DS Game awards for 2010 from IGN.

An enhanced port, titled Shantae: Risky's Revenge – Director's Cut, was released for Microsoft Windows on June 14, 2014, PlayStation 4 on June 23, 2015, Wii U on March 24, 2016, Nintendo Switch and Xbox One on October 15, 2020, and Google Stadia on February 23, 2021.

Shantae and the Pirate's Curse (2014)

The third game in the series, Shantae and the Pirate's Curse, was released for Nintendo 3DS on October 23, 2014, and for Wii U on December 25, 2014, both via the Nintendo eShop. The game received critical acclaim, and was featured in the best sellers list on the 3DS eShop soon after release. The game was later ported to Microsoft Windows, PlayStation 4, Xbox One, and Nintendo Switch.

Shantae: Half-Genie Hero (2016)

The fourth game in the series, Shantae: Half-Genie Hero, was crowdfunded via a Kickstarter campaign in 2013. The game was released digitally and physically on December 20, 2016 for Wii U, PlayStation 4 and PlayStation Vita, and digitally on Microsoft Windows and Xbox One. It was also released on Nintendo Switch on June 8, 2017, and Google Stadia on February 23, 2021.

Shantae and the Seven Sirens (2019) 

The fifth game in the series, Shantae and the Seven Sirens was announced in March 2019 and released for Apple Arcade in September 2019. Ports for Microsoft Windows, Nintendo Switch, PlayStation 4 and Xbox One were released on May 28, 2020.

Other games
Some characters from the series have made crossover appearances in other games: Shantae and Bolo appear as playable characters in the Apple Watch game Watch Quest. A Shantae-themed microgame, "Shantae NAB!", was created by Matt Bozon in WarioWare D.I.Y. and distributed by Nintendo as one of its "Big Name Games" entries. Risky Boots was meant to be featured in Hyper Light Drifter by Heart Machine, as part of a mutual support action between the Kickstarter funding campaigns for that game and Half-Genie Hero, but this was absent from the final game. Shantae appeared as a guest character in Mutant Mudds Super Challenge and in Runbow and Blaster Master Zero as a downloadable guest character. Both Shantae and Risky Boots appear in Super Smash Bros. Ultimate as spirits, with Shantae later becoming available as a Mii Brawler costume via downloadable content alongside the "Neo Burning Town" music track from Shantae: Half-Genie Hero on June 29, 2021. Shantae was planned to be featured as a playable supporting character in the crowdfunded game Indivisible, but was later canceled.

Canceled games

Plans for a sequel to Shantae started soon after its release. In the early 2000s, WayForward exprimented with protoyping a 3D Shantae game for the GameCube, but these plans were set aside in favor of focusing on a handheld sequel.

Shantae Advance, also known as Shantae 2: Risky Revolution, was a sequel that was in development for the Game Boy Advance, but was canceled after not being picked up by a publisher. A demo of the first world was developed, and while not released to the public, WayForward streamed a full playthrough of it on October 3, 2013, as part of a promotion for the crowdfunding of Half-Genie Hero.

Shantae Advance was planned to consist of eight chapters of gameplay split over seven towns, six islands, and six labyrinths; this was estimated to take about twenty hours to play through. In addition to the regular gameplay, six minigames and a multiplayer battle mode were planned. Four of the labyrinths were supposed to be based on the four seasons; the first labyrinth, which was featured in the demo, was based on autumn, and its hub room was filled with falling autumn leaves. The story of Shantae Advance involved Risky having her Tinkerbats digging under Sequin Land, and putting a pillar in the middle, allowing the land to be rotated. This could be used in the gameplay to rotate the world, lining up the foreground with objects in the background, thus giving the player access to new areas.

New gameplay elements for Shantae Advance included the ability to move between the foreground and background, swimming, flying in 3D on the back of Sky's bird Wrench, and some new forms for Shantae to transform into; these included a new version of the spider, a crab, and a mermaid. Many of these features were ultimately implemented into later titles; background movement, swimming, and the mermaid transformation were introduced in Risky's Revenge, while flying on Wrench and all three transformations were used in Half-Genie Hero. As with the original game, Shantae Advance was developed by Matt Bozon on his own time.

Another attempt at a Shantae sequel was Shantae: Risky Waters, a game planned for the Nintendo DS with experimental gameplay taking advantage of the double screen function of the console. Plans were scrapped after WayForward failed to find a publisher as well as with Shantae Advance.

Notes

References

 
Video games about shapeshifting
Video game franchises
Metroidvania games
Video game franchises introduced in 2002
Video games about magic
Video games featuring female protagonists
WayForward games
Indie video games